This is a list of chapters for the Japanese manga series Hayate the Combat Butler written and illustrated by manga author Kenjiro Hata. It was serialized in Shogakukan's Weekly Shōnen Sunday starting from October 2004 to April 2017. The manga released 52 volumes in bound volume form in Japan. 38 volumes have been translated into English and distributed in North America by Viz Media.


Volume list
Note: Viz's official English-translated titles through volume 30, unofficial Japanese translations thereafter.

References

Chapters
Hayate the Combat Butler